Apostu is a Romanian surname. Notable people with the surname include:

Bogdan Apostu (born 1982), Romanian footballer
Sorin Apostu (born 1968), Romanian politician

Romanian-language surnames